Dr. Niratcha Tungtisanont, nicknamed Grace (born April 19, 1987, in Bangkok) is an assistant professor in the Department of Logistics, Business & Public Policy at the Robert H. Smith School of Business. She was also the official representative of Thailand to the 2011 Miss Earth pageant.

Personal life 
Tungtisanont was born and raised in Bangkok, Thailand.  She graduated from the University of Arizona with BA in Economics and Mathematics within 3 years. She also worked as a research/data assistant at her university while she was studying. She got a full graduate assistant scholarship to complete her Master of Science in Agricultural and Resource Economics degree from University of Arizona, United States of America. She completed her MS in July 2010. While she competed in Miss Thailand Universe pageant she also received many offers to pursue her Ph.D. from various universities in the United States. She received her Ph.D. in Operations Management from Clemson University. Her dissertation focuses on Humanitarian Operations and Crisis Management.

Miss Thailand Universe 2011 
Tungtisanont who stands 172.5 cm, competed in the 2011 Miss Thailand Universe pageant, held on March 26, 2011, at Royal Paragon Hall in Bangkok, Thailand, where she placed first-runner up to "Fah" Chanyasorn Sakornchan, gaining the right to represent her country at Miss Earth 2011 in Manila, Philippines.

Miss Earth 2011 
As the official representative of Thailand to the 2011 Miss Earth pageant to be held in December 2011, Tungtisanont will vie to succeed current Miss Earth title holder, Nicole Faria of India. She placed in a semi-finalist (Top 16) and received People's Choice Award and Miss Golden Sunset in Miss Earth 2011.

External links
Miss Thailand Universe Official Website
MTU on facebook

Living people
University of Arizona alumni
Miss Earth 2011 contestants
Niratcha Tungtisanont
1987 births
Niratcha Tungtisanont
Clemson University alumni
University of Maryland, College Park faculty
Miss Earth Thailand